UDSD may refer to:
Upper Darby School District, Upper Darby Township, Delaware County, Pennsylvania
Upper Dublin School District, Upper Dublin Township, Montgomery County, Pennsylvania